Idalus dognini is a moth of the family Erebidae. It was described by Walter Rothschild in 1910. It is found in Peru.

References

dognini
Moths described in 1910